The Tax and Customs Board, also known by its acronym MTA, is the taxation authority in the Republic of Estonia. It is an agency of the Ministry of Finance.

The agency deals with collection of revenue for the state budget, the implementation of tax laws, customs rules and related legislation, enforcement, licensing gambling companies and lottery organisations, supervision and inspection of gambling and lotteries, and provision of service to citizens and e-residents to aid in fulfilment of tax liability and customs procedures.

References

External links  
 

Government agencies of Estonia
Revenue services
Economy of Estonia